Romuald Charles Eugène Gaudens Jean Sylve Joubé (20 June 1876 – 14 September 1949) was a French stage and film actor whose career on the stage and in films lasted approximately thirty years.

Career
Born in Mazères, Ariège, Romuald Joubé began his stage career at the Odéon theatre under the direction of 
André Antoine. He was in residence at the Comédie Française from 1921 to 1922. Joubé's career was spent primarily on the theatre stage. However, he managed a lengthy film career as well, beginning in 1909. Joubé got his start in films in productions made by the early French film company Studio Film d'Art. In total, Joubé appeared in over forty films during a period of more than thirty years. He appeared as the character Jean Diaz in both the 1919 Abel Gance-directed silent film drama J'accuse! and Gance's 1938 eponymously titled sound film remake.

Death
Romuald Joubé died in 1949 at the age of 73 in Gisors, Eure, France.

Filmography

References

External links

Romuald Joubé at flickr

1876 births
1949 deaths
French male stage actors
French male film actors
French male silent film actors
People from Ariège (department)
20th-century French male actors